John A. Osborne Airport (Gerald's Airport until 2008)  is a small airport located in the village of Gerald's on the island of Montserrat, a British Overseas Territory in the Caribbean Sea.

History
Gerald's passenger terminal was dedicated in February 2005 by Anne, Princess Royal and the facility was formally opened on 11 July 2005. It features a 600-metre runway, a restaurant, modern air traffic control technology, and immigration facilities. It is the only airport in the Caribbean with a public tunnel under its runway. The total cost of construction was approximately US$18.5 million.

The completion of John A. Osborne Airport allowed for the resumption of regular commercial airline service to Montserrat for the first time since 1997, when W. H. Bramble Airport, which had been the island's only aviation gateway, was destroyed by an eruption of the nearby Soufrière Hills volcano. Between 1997 and 2005, Montserrat had been accessible only by helicopters, boats and seaplanes.

The airport's name was changed in July 2008 to honour John Osborne, long-standing Chief Minister of Montserrat.

The airline FlyMontserrat has its headquarters on the airport property.

Airlines and destinations

Statistics

See also 

List of shortest runways
Video of FlyMontserrat plane landing in Montserrat

References

External links 
FlyMontserrat

2005 establishments in Montserrat
Airports established in 2005
Airports in Montserrat